Jane Murphy may refer to:

Jane Murphy, Irish suffragette was one of the Cadiz sisters
Jane Hamsher, US film producer, author, and blogger was born Jane Murphy

See also
Murphy (surname)